The Autoroute Casablanca–Agadir is a new main road in Morocco. Building began in 2000 and the road was inaugurated on 21 June 2010 by Prince Moulay Rachid.

Casablanca–Marrakesh 

It has been designated A3 as its identity marker. Total length is 219 km: 57 km Casablanca–Settat and 162 km Settat–Marrakech

The expressway takes its origins south of the residential area of Casablanca, at the interchange with the A1 Rabat–Safi expressway. It continues south past Bouskoura and serves the Mohamed V airport with an exit. A toll station is placed just south of there. The road then circumvales the town of Berrechid serving it with an exit north of it for south-bound traffic and one south of it for north-bound traffic.

The road was opened in 2002 to Settat, and construction on the remaining part started in 2003 reaching Marrakesh in 2007. In 2005 the 17 km bypass of Settat opened. When the Marrakech–Agadir expressway opened in 2009 it was directly connected to this A3.

The Casablanca–Marrakesh highway was completed and opened to traffic on April 17, 2007.

Toll-revenues of this road, including the Casablanca bypass, totaled 219 million dirhams, reaching 3rd spot of top earners

Marrakesh–Agadir

Financial
In June 2004 the Moroccan operator of expressways ADM signed an agreement with the Hasan II Society for economic and social development for a refinancing scheme of the ADM. This financial injection made construction of new roads possible and construction started in 2006.

The road is a toll road or péage to pay back the investments.

Beside the ADM several other parties are involved. Some major investors participate in specific sections of the road or a general goal.

The main investors are (in million dirham)

 BID - Islamic Bank for Development   - 965 MDH
 FADES -Arab Fund for social and economic development - 920
 FKDEA- Kuwait Fund for Arab and Economic Development - 450
 BAD - African Bank for Development - 1315
 JBIC- Japan Bank for International Cooperation - 1370

Overview
Below is a short overview of the different sub-projects, the costs (against the estimated costs) and the main contractors for that section. For some sections, only contractors for initial work are reported.

Construction
Work is divided into several main sections, each with their own contractors and workers. Construction of a 4-lane motorway through the mountains of the High Atlas requires many structures as fly-overs, viaducts and bridges. The existing national road (route nationale) is used for transportation of building material etc. Along this route, new exits and side roads are constructed to several main working locations and temporary factories (concrete, storage, camp-sites for builders, etc.).

The new road crosses the existing road several times and follows more or less the same route through the mountains.

Layout
Over the full length the new autoroute has:
 two standard traffic lanes in each direction, each 3.5 meters wide with a central separation zone of at least 3 meters
 one emergency lane / hard shoulder in each direction of 1.5 meters wide

The road has 8 exits/entries, 9 toll-port gates and 4 rest stops with petrol stations, cafés and a room or building for praying. Thirteen viaducts and one tunnel were built to complete the road (excluding viaducts built over the road and/or tunnels under the road for crossing inferior local roads or feet-bridges: if you include these another 100 structures can be included.

Toll road
As (nearly) all Moroccan expressways this new section is also a toll road.

The existing national road will remain open as a toll-free alternative for the autoroute as well as allowing access to smaller villages and roads. Traveling time between Marrakesh and Agadir will be reduced greatly as the autoroute allows overtaking everywhere (4 lane), bypasses villages and allows higher speeds. Possible speed on 2-lane national roads is often greatly reduced due to very slow lorries crawling up a hill while steep bends and traffic from the other side make overtaking hazardous or impossible.

The Marrakesh–Agadir section completes a north-south corridor of expressways that shortens the travel-distance on the route Tangier to Agadir by nearly 50 km (via toll-roads the distance is 776 and via the Route Nationale 824 km. But the biggest save is driving-time: the average travelling time Tangier–Agadir over national (free) roads is 14.5 hours while the same via the different toll-roads is under 7.5 hours

Route

  Junction between A3 and N11 : Casablanca-Sidi Maârouf / Casablanca-Center (km 0)
 Junction between A3 and A1 : Port of Casablanca / Had Soualem / El Jadida / Rabat / Tangier / Oujda (km 0)
  at  : Bouskoura-Ville Verte
  at  : Bouskoura-Centre
  at  : Mohammed V Airport / Nouaceur
  Bouskoura Toll Station (Agadir - Casablanca direction) (km 16)
  North-Berrechid Toll Station (Casablanca - Agadir direction) (km 23) +  at  : North Berrechid (Casablanca - Agadir direction)
  Junction between A3 and A4 : Khouribga / Beni Mellal
  at  : Berrechid-Center / Khouribga / Beni Mellal  via route nationale — N11
  South Berrechid Toll Station
  (km 37)
  at  : Settat-North
  at  : Settat-Center / El Borouj
 Settat (both directions) (km 78)
 Oued Oum Rabbia (Agadir - Casablanca direction) (km 109)
  at  : Skhour Rehamna
  (Casablanca - Agadir direction) /  (Agadir - Casablanca direction) (km 154)
  at  : Ben Guerir / Youssoufia / El Kelaa des Sraghna 
  (Casablanca - Agadir direction) /  (Agadir - Casablanca direction) (km 193)
  at  : Marrakech-Palmeraie
  at  : Marrakech-Tamansourt / Youssoufia / Safi / El Jadida via N7 
  (both directions) (km 229)
  at  : Marrakech-Targa
  at  : Marrakech-Loudaya
  (both directions) (km 278)
  at  : Chichaoua / Essaouira (via R207 toll-free expressway)
 at  : Imintanoute
 Zaouiat Ait Mellal Tunnel (km 325)
  (both directions) (km 345)
 at  : Argana
 (Casablanca - Agadir direction) (km 402) 
 Ameskroud Toll Station (km 419)
 at  : Ameskroud / Taroudant (via toll-free expressway)
 - Haliopolis (both direction) (km 423) 
 at  : N1 — Agadir / Tiznit / Laayoune

Sources and footnotes

Expressway, Casablanca
Expressway, Agadir
A3